Archaeobelodon is an extinct genus of proboscidean of the family Amebelodontidae that lived in Europe and North Africa (Egypt) during the Miocene from 16.9 to 16.0 Ma, living for approximately .
 
Archaeobelodon was an ancestor of Platybelodon and Amebelodon. Archaeobelodon had a trunk and tusks. It reached a weight of about 2305 - 3477 kg, being smaller than a modern elephant.

References

Amebelodontidae
Miocene proboscideans
Miocene mammals of Africa
Prehistoric placental genera
Fossil taxa described in 1984